The Sound of Thunder is a 1957 Australian television play by Australian writer Iain MacCormick. It starred Moira Carleton. It was described as "the longest and most ambitious play ABN [the ABC] has put over so far" although The Importance of Being Ernest, which followed on December 18, exceeded it by 12 minutes.

It was made at a time when Australian drama production was rare and was one of the first productions in Melbourne.

Premise

In Italy in 1944, a small   advance   group   of   Allied soldiers arrives at an Italian farm to meet up with some partisan troops, with the aim of blowing up a supply dump. There is a love story between Pietro and Lucia.

Cast
 Edward Brayshaw as Pietro
 Judith Godden as Lucia
 Robert Peach as the English Major Campe
 Philip Staintin as Papa
Lewis Tegart as the Old Man
Alan Hopgood as Cpl Kutsky
Sydney Conabere as Seppi
Neville Thurgood as Cpl Little
John Morgan as Vincente

Production
The Sound of Thunder was the first of a cycle of war plays under the title of The Promised Years. The series was written for BBC television by English writer Iain McCormack. The plays deal with the effect of war on small groups of ordinary people of different nationalities, "small people in the big messup," according to McCormick. They were based on personal war time experiences.

The ABC had previously broadcast Small Victory by MacCormick and would later do Act of Violence (1959) by the same author.

William Sterling went down to Melbourne to produce the play in September and October. (Sterling would later settle in the city.) It involved seven weeks of preparation, three weeks of rehearsals and two days of camera rehearsals before it was telecast, and filmed for Sydney TV. Judith Godden was in holiday in Melbourne when cast. Robert Peach was a compere of C.M.F. entertainment units in Melbourne.

Sterling spent several weeks looking at amateur theatre in Melbourne. He was inspired by Italian neo realism. "It’s   right   on   television,”  he   says.   "You're   watching ordinary   people,   close   up,  in  highly   emotional   situations.” Among the amateurs he cast were Lewis Tegart, who had been acting in Little Theatre for 20 years but never professionally, and Alan Hopgood, who was a school teacher who had been performing in a   university   revue.

It was filmed out of the Coppin Hall studios.

See also
List of live television plays broadcast on Australian Broadcasting Corporation (1950s)

References

External links

Australian television plays
1957 television plays